Christophe Petibout (born 21 December 1967 in Roanne) is a French sprint canoeist who competed in the late 1980s. He finished ninth in the K-4 1000 m event at the 1988 Summer Olympics in Seoul.

References
 Sports-reference.com profile

1967 births
Canoeists at the 1988 Summer Olympics
French male canoeists
Living people
Olympic canoeists of France
Place of birth missing (living people)